Hell on the Border is a 2019 American Western film written and directed by Wes Miller and starring David Gyasi, Ron Perlman and Frank Grillo.  It includes characters based on the true story of Bass Reeves, the first African-American deputy U.S. Marshal west of the Mississippi River.

Cast
David Gyasi as Bass Reeves
Ron Perlman as Charlie Storm
Frank Grillo as Bob Dozier
Zahn McClarnon as Sam Sixkiller
Gianni Capaldi as Tom Pinkerton
Manu Intiraymi as Judge Isaac Parker
Ashley Atwood as Jessie Winston
Jaqueline Fleming as Nellie Reeves
Kerrington Gilbert as Harriet Reeves
Chris Mullinax as U.S. Marshal Franks
Michael Aaron Milligan as U.S. Marshal Jim Bruce
Randy Wayne as Jack 'Irish Jack'
Marshall R. Teague as Senator Smith
David William Arnott as President Ulysses S. Grant
Amber Sweet as Belle Starr
Alexander Kane as Frank James
Nick Loren as Captain George Reeves
Rudy Youngblood as Rufus Buck
Carlos Velazquez as Ned
Vernon Davis as Columbus
Curtis Nichouls as Pap
Rebecca Sheehan Caine as Bob Dozier's Wife (uncredited)

Release
The film was released on Blu-Ray and VOD on December 13, 2019.

Reception
The film has  rating on Rotten Tomatoes.  Alan Ng of Film Threat gave the film a 7 out of 10.

References

External links
 
 

American biographical films
American Western (genre) films
2010s English-language films
Films directed by Wes Miller
2010s American films
Films about capital punishment